José Della Torre (born 23 March 1906 – 31 July 1979) was an Argentine footballer. He played as a right-back for Argentina in the 1930 FIFA World Cup final in 1930, which the team lost 4–2 to Uruguay.

After retiring as a player, Della Torre went on to become a football manager. In 1958, he led Racing Club de Avellaneda to the Argentine Primera championship. He also managed Ferro Carril Oeste amongst others.

At the South American Championship of 1959 in Argentina, which was won by the hosts, he was together with Victorio Spinetto and José Barreiro joint manager of the Argentinian team.

Career overview 
Player
 1925-1926: San Isidro
 1927–1933: Racing Club
 1934: America FC (RJ)
 1935–1936: Ferro Carril Oeste
 1937: CA Atlanta
 1938–1941: America FC (RJ)

Manager
 1941: CA Platense
 1942–1943: Ferro Carril Oeste
 1947–1948: America FC (RJ)
 1949–1952: Ferro Carril Oeste
 1958: Racing Club
 1959: Argentina
 1959-1960: CA Platense
 1961: Ferro Carril Oeste
 1962: CA Platense
 1963: Palestino
 1964: CA Platense

References 
 

1906 births
1979 deaths
Argentine footballers
Argentine people of Italian descent
Argentina international footballers
Association football defenders
Argentine football managers
Racing Club de Avellaneda footballers
America Football Club (RJ) players
Ferro Carril Oeste footballers
Ferro Carril Oeste managers
Club Atlético Atlanta footballers
Racing Club de Avellaneda managers
1930 FIFA World Cup players
Expatriate football managers in Chile
Argentine expatriate footballers
Argentine expatriate sportspeople in Brazil
Expatriate footballers in Brazil
People from San Isidro, Buenos Aires
Sportspeople from Buenos Aires Province